Roma Sztárparádé is a show of Romany artists in Hungary which was recorded at a number of nightclubs and sites across the country.

A number of DVDs of the show were released, featuring artists such as Mary Nótár.

References

Romani in Hungary
Romani music